Musix GNU+Linux is a discontinued live CD and DVD Linux distribution for the IA-32 processor family based on Debian. It contained a collection of software for audio production, graphic design, video editing and general purpose applications. The initiator and co-director of the project was Marcos Germán Guglielmetti.

Musix GNU+Linux was one of the few Linux distributions recognized by the Free Software Foundation as being composed completely of free software.

Musix was developed by a team from Argentina, Spain, Mexico and Brazil. The main language used in development discussion and documentation was Spanish; however, Musix had a community of users who speak Spanish, Portuguese, and English.

Software

Musix 1.0 
The Musix 0.x and 1.0 Rx versions were released between 2005 and 2008, with Musix 1.0 R6 being the last stable release on DVD and Musix 1.0 R2R5 the last stable release on CD.

The Live CD system had 1350 software packages. The Live DVD had 2279 software packages.

Some of the programs included: Rosegarden and Ardour, both for musicians; Inkscape for vectorial design; GIMP for manipulation of images; Cinelerra for video editing and Blender for 3D animation.

Its desktop was very light (only 18 MB of RAM with X.org), based on IceWM/ROX-Filer and it had a unique feature: multiple "pinboards" ordered by General Purpose apps, Help, Office, Root/Admin, MIDI, Internet, Graphics, and Audio. The pinboards are arrays of desktop backgrounds and icons.

A small version of the KDE desktop was included by default on the Live-CD version. The Live-DVD has a full KDE version, supporting several languages.

Musix 2.0 
Musix 2.0 was developed using the live-helper scripts from the Debian-Live project. The first Alpha version of Musix 2.0 was released on 25 March 2009 including two realtime-patched Linux-Libre kernels.

On 17 May 2009 the first beta version of Musix 2.0 was released.

The final Musix GNU+Linux 2.0 version on CD, DVD and USB was released in November 2009 by Daniel Vidal, Suso Comesaña, Carlos Sanchiavedraz, Joseangon and other Musix developers. This version was presented at the "Palau Firal de Congressos de Tarragona, España" by Suso Comesaña.

A similar LINUX-version, developed by Brazilian music teacher Gilberto André Borges, was named "Adriane" or "MusixBr". This version was not a fork and was derived from Knoppix 6.1 Adriane.

See also 

 Comparison of Linux distributions
 dyne:bolic – another free distribution for multimedia enthusiasts
 GNU/Linux naming controversy
 List of Linux distributions based on Debian

References

External links

 

Debian-based distributions
Free audio software
Operating system distributions bootable from read-only media
Knoppix
Linux media creation distributions
Free software only Linux distributions
2008 software
Linux distributions